The 1995 Stanford Cardinal football team represented Stanford University in the 1995 NCAA Division I-A football season. The Cardinal played in the Pacific-10 Conference. The Cardinal's new head coach was Tyrone Willingham, hired to replace Bill Walsh.

Schedule

Roster

References

Stanford
Stanford Cardinal football seasons
Stanford Cardinal football